Sebastian Hernandez (born February 10, 2003) is an American soccer player who plays as a midfielder for LA Galaxy II in the USL Championship via the LA Galaxy academy.

Career 
He made his debut for LA Galaxy II on August 19, 2020 vs. Phoenix Rising FC. He also appeared as a late substitute in the conference quarterfinals of the USL Championship playoffs.

Career statistics

Club

References

External links
Sebastian Hernandez at US Soccer Development Academy

2003 births
Living people
LA Galaxy II players
USL Championship players
American soccer players
Association football midfielders
Soccer players from California
People from Lompoc, California